The Colloquium on Violence and Religion (COV&R) is an international organization dedicated to “exploring, critiquing, and developing” the mimetic theory proposed by the French historian, literary critic, and anthropological philosopher René Girard. Membership includes scholars of theology, religious studies, literary studies, philosophy, psychology, and other academic fields as well as clergy and other practitioners.

Girard's work focused on the sources of human violence in mimetic (unconsciously imitative) desire and the centrality of religion in the formation of culture through the management of violence (the single-victim mechanism or scapegoat effect), but the scope of the Colloquium on Violence & Religion's interest has expanded beyond violence to mimetic desire's positive potential and beyond religion to other disciplines.

The Colloquium on Violence & Religion is affiliated with regional organizations around the world devoted to Girard's work, mimetic theory, and peacemaking.

History 
The Colloquium on Violence & Religion began with a meeting in 1990 at Stanford University with theologians James G. Williams, Robert Hamerton-Kelly, and Charles Mabee as its three co-founders. When constituted formally in 1991, it formed a board with Girard as honorary chair; Raymund Schwager, a theologian from the University of Innsbruck, as president; Williams as executive secretary; and Wolfgang Palaver (de), also a theologian from Innsbruck, as editor of the newsletter. Prominent board members have included James Alison, Eric Gans, and Walter Wink.

Publications 
Michigan State University Press publishes the annual journal of Colloquium on Violence & Religion, Contagion: Journal of Violence, Mimesis, and Culture (ISSN 1930-1200) and two related series of books: Breakthroughs in Mimetic Theory and Studies in Violence, Mimesis, and Culture.

Colloquium on Violence & Religion also publishes a quarterly online newsletter, The Bulletin of the Colloquium on Violence and Religion.

A complete bibliography is included in the fully searchable Index Theologicus database.

Annual Meeting 
Colloquium on Violence & Religion holds an annual summer meeting, usually in July. The location has recently rotated in a three-year cycle between sites in North America, Europe, and the rest of the world. It also meets in conjunction with the annual meeting of the American Academy of Religion in November.

Presidents 
 1991–1995: Raymund Schwager
 1995–1999: Cesário Bandera
 1999–2003: Diana Culbertson
 2003–2007: Sandor Goodhart
 2007–2011: Wolfgang Palaver (de)
 2011–2015: Ann W. Astell
 2015–2019: Jeremiah Alberg
 2019–2023: Martha Reineke

References

External links 
 
Index Theologicus bibliography of mimetic theory

Violence
Religion
Theology